Youves are an English dance-punk quintet from Nuneaton, formed in 2003. The band consists of lead vocalist Stephen Broadley, guitarists Michael King and Alex Wiezak, bassist Luke Neale and drummer Paul Wechter. The band's sound is an energetic mixture of punk, dance and new wave, which is characterized by an emphasis on percussion with polyrhythmic qualities and a quirky sometimes described as 'violent' but simplistic duel between guitars with a danceable edge.

In 2009, the band released their mini-album Cardio-Vascular which has been received with widespread acclaim from many notable publications.

History
The band formed in 2003 as a hardcore punk band named 'The Tragic Vision' which consisted of Stephen Broadley, Michael King, Alex Wiezak, Jordan Daniel and Adam Mallabone. The band soon played many basement shows and house parties until less than a year later Jordan and Adam left the band. Soon after they recruited bassist Luke Neale and Drummer Jon McGovern. Developing their hardcore punk sound with many danceable qualities and soon becoming a fully fledged band they began gigging under name 'Mirror!Mirror!' in 2004. After a few months of relentless touring with bands such as Klaxons and Blood Red Shoes they released a split 7-inch record with Rolo Tomassi on Speedowax records.

The band then went on a break which lasted a year and during this time Jon McGovern had left the band which led to the recruitment of Craig Thornicroft to play drums. During this time they abandoned their hardcore punk sound and replaced it with a more dance-oriented sound which holds the intensity of hardcore punk which they possessed in previous projects. The band released the single "Wolfgang Bang", which remains in their setlist. Soon they signed a deal with Holy Roar Records to release a seven track mini-album but decided to not work under the name 'Mirror!Mirror!' and changed their name to 'Youves'. While writing new material and touring non-stop through the UK and Europe they released their mini-album Cardio-Vascular in the spring of 2009 to positive reviews from the NME and Rock Sound and the single and music video "Aladdins Rave" was released with moderate rotation which also led to the band enjoying a considerable amount of press.

The band are currently writing and recording their debut full-length album, working with former drummer Craig Thornicroft.

Musical style
The band's Sound has been described by Rock Sound as "Unpretentious, Inventive and Infectious Dance-Punk Played with Style". The Fly described their sound as "Gang Of Four attacking The Rapture with a rusty breadknife-like guitar, awkward disco and lashings of cow bell". Artrocker also compared the band to The Rapture and Radio 4.

Discography

As Mirror!Mirror!
 4 track Cassette (Stop Scratching Records) - 2007
 split 7-inch w/ Rolo Tomassi (Speedo Wax Records) - 2008
 "Wolfgang Bang" / "Silicone Eyes" 7-inch Single (Tough Love Records) - 2008

As Youves
Cardio-Vascular / Digital E.P (Holy Roar Records) - 2009

Current members
 Stephen Broadley - Lead Vocals
 Alex Wiezak - Guitar and Backing Vocals
 Michael King - Guitar and Backing Vocals
 Luke Neale - Bass guitar
 Paul Wechter - Drums

Former members
 Jon McGovern - Drums
 Craig Thornicroft -Drums
 Jordan Daniel - Bass

References

External links
 Blog page

Musical groups established in 2003
English indie rock groups
Dance-punk musical groups
Post-punk revival music groups